Giorgio Piantanida (born 15 September 1967 in Busto Arsizio) is a retired Italian alpine skier.

References

External links
 

1967 births
Living people
Italian male alpine skiers
People from Busto Arsizio
Sportspeople from the Province of Varese
20th-century Italian people